The Carolina Theatre in Charlotte, North Carolina, is a historic movie house currently undergoing restoration to become a performing arts center and civic convening space. The theatre is owned by the nonprofit Foundation For The Carolinas.

History 
The Carolina Theatre opened in 1927, as part of Paramount Picture's Publix Theatre chain. The opening feature was the silent movie, A Kiss in a Taxi. Originally, movies ran for three days, and vaudeville performers were on stage Thursdays, Fridays and Saturdays. In 1938, the theatre was renovated to accommodate sound films, with the original murals replaced with acoustic tiles. On Feb. 10, 1956, the theatre played host to a performance by Elvis Presley. The Sound of Music would premiere at the Carolina Theatre on March 31, 1965, and run a record 79 weeks. The 398,201 people who saw the movie were more than the population of Charlotte, at the time. With rising competition from suburban multiplexes, the theatre closed on Nov. 27, 1978, with a showing of Bruce Lee’s Fists of Fury. Arson furthered damaged the theatre in the 1980s.

Renovation
After many unsuccessful attempts to renovate and revive the theatre, the City of Charlotte acquired the building in 1986 and sold it to Foundation For The Carolinas in April 2013. The renovation will restore historical touches, such as the murals and original marquee, to replicate the original 1927 atmosphere as much as possible. Most of the $51.5 million of the budget was raised from private sources. Construction on the restoration began in 2017.
The theatre will be part of a larger Civic Campus called Belk Place. When completed, programming will focus on civic discussions, speakers, community gatherings, films, concerts and more.

After many delays, foundation executive vice president Laura Smith said that after many delays the theater would reopen in Spring 2023.

InterContinental Hotel 
In March 2017, it was announced that, as part of the theatre's restoration, a 257-room InterContinental hotel would be built atop the structure. The developer is Salter Brothers of Melbourne, Australia formerly SB&G Hotel Group and Valor Hospitality Partners will operate the hotel once it's open. The project is estimated to cost $100. The project broke ground and the tower crane was installed in October 2019.

The hotel project was put on hold in November 2020, when the developers lost their financing, due to the economic impact of the COVID-19 pandemic.  Hotel demand dropped by 40% due to the COVID-19 pandemic since the hotel relies heavily upon business travel.
On August 25, 2022, Foundation For the Carolinas CEO Michael Marsicano said that after many delays, construction would resume soon.

References

External links

Theatres in Charlotte, North Carolina
Theatres completed in 1927
1927 establishments in North Carolina
InterContinental hotels